Eino Vilho Forsström (10 April 1889 – 26 July 1961) was a Finnish gymnast who won two medals in the 1908 and 1912 Summer Olympics.

At the time of the Games he represented the club Katajaiset.

He won the Finnish national championship in team gymnastics as a member of Ylioppilasvoimistelijat in 1909.

He was among the best boxers in Finland in 1908–1910.

He married Matilda Irene Larsson in 1915.

Sources

References 

1889 births
1961 deaths
Finnish male artistic gymnasts
Gymnasts at the 1908 Summer Olympics
Gymnasts at the 1912 Summer Olympics
Olympic gymnasts of Finland
Olympic silver medalists for Finland
Olympic bronze medalists for Finland
Olympic medalists in gymnastics
Medalists at the 1912 Summer Olympics
Medalists at the 1908 Summer Olympics
Sportspeople from Helsinki
20th-century Finnish people